Ahn Byung-hong or Ahn Byung-hoon (安秉勳 born 6 October 1940) is a South Korean former cyclist. He competed in the individual road race and team time trial events at the 1964 Summer Olympics.

References

External links
 

1940 births
Living people
South Korean male cyclists
Olympic cyclists of South Korea
Cyclists at the 1964 Summer Olympics
Place of birth missing (living people)
Asian Games medalists in cycling
Cyclists at the 1962 Asian Games
Cyclists at the 1966 Asian Games
Medalists at the 1962 Asian Games
Medalists at the 1966 Asian Games
Asian Games gold medalists for South Korea
Asian Games silver medalists for South Korea
20th-century South Korean people
21st-century South Korean people